Diplosoma may refer to:
 Diplosoma (tunicate), a genus of tunicates in the family Didemnidae
 Diplosoma (plant), a genus of plants in the family Aizoaceae